Björn Again is a musical tribute act that parodies the iconic 1970s Swedish pop group, ABBA. The show was created in Australia in 1988 and features performers from various countries. The name "Björn Again" is a playful nod to ABBA's Björn Ulvaeus, with a revivalist association to the phrase "born again". Over the past 34 years, Björn Again has performed in 72 countries, totaling around 5,500 shows.

Character of the show

Björn Again is a fun and playful tribute act that parodies the famous Swedish pop group, ABBA, using a mix of English and Swedish language (known as "Swenglish" or pidgin Swedish). The performers take on stage names that pay homage to the original ABBA members, including Agnetha Falstart, Benny Anderwear, Frida Longstokin, and Björn Volvo-us, as well as bassist Rutger Sonofagunn and drummer Ola Drumkitt (based on Rutger Gunnarsson and Ola Brunkert). The show features choreographed acts with unique costumes and song arrangements that differ from ABBA's original performances.

History

Björn Again is an ABBA tribute band that originated in Melbourne, Australia in October 1988 by Rod Stephen. The name Björn Again was inspired by Stephen's pseudonym he used while skiing in the 1980s, and is a light-hearted parody of ABBA using pidgin Swedish or 'Swenglish.' The original members included Rod Stephen, Peter Ryan, John Tyrrell, Dorina Morelli, Kathy Riseborough, Gavin Charles and later Janette Stuart. Since their debut in 1989, Björn Again has gained a lot of popularity and gone on to perform approximately 5,500 shows in 72 countries over 34 years. By 1997, Björn Again had three touring lineups. Nowadays, Rod Stephen manages the UK/Europe lineup and John Tyrrell manages the Australasian lineup, both of which differ significantly in artistic style.

Björn Again is an ABBA tribute band that has recorded and performed live a total of 133 songs, including 55 ABBA songs, 7 originals, and 62 covers by other artists. They have also released an EP of covers of Erasure songs done in the style of ABBA, called Erasure-ish, which included the songs "Stop!" and "A Little Respect" that achieved Number 25 on the UK Singles Chart in September 1992.

Björn Again has performed at events ranging from large rock festivals worldwide, including Reading and Glastonbury, to private performances for celebrities, including playing at parties for UK golfer Colin Montgomerie, Microsoft co-founder Bill Gates, comedian Rowan Atkinson, actor Russell Crowe, and Russian president Vladimir Putin.

On December 17, 2012, Björn Again performed at the Buckingham Palace Christmas party attended by the Queen and members of the royal family and their staff. They also performed a show in honor of Agnetha Fältskog at Stockholm's TV3/TV6 tenth-anniversary party, where she was quoted saying “It was a great show. I loved the choreography" and "Good Luck for the tour.”

In 1999, the UK Bjorn Again took part in a documentary for Channel 5 entitled "ABBA: Bjorn Again!", which included Björn Again on tour. The documentary explored some of the history of the show, and throughout the program, the members spoke in "Swenglish" accents.

Both Björn Ulvaeus and Benny Andersson have lauded Björn Again a number of times over the years, and after ABBA's former members made their intentions known that they were not going to perform together any longer, Andersson was quoted as saying in 1999, "BJÖRN AGAIN are the closest you can get to seeing ABBA. ABBA will never reform!"

Björn Again has also attended a celebrity gala in costume at the London Savoy to receive a belated award on behalf of ABBA from the radio times acknowledging 30 years since their Eurovision Song Contest triumph with Waterloo in Brighton on 6 April 1974. They performed Metallica's "Enter Sandman" with an additional drummer to a receptive Sonisphere Festival crowd at Knebworth in August 2009, as a nod to the headlining act. Additionally, they have been the opening act on the Pyramid stage at the Glastonbury Festival in 1999, 2009, and 2019.

Discography

Albums

Singles

Videos
 Live At The Royal Albert Hall (1998)
 ABBA Karaoke featuring Björn Again (1998)
 ABBA: Björn Again (2001)
 Gimme Gimme Gimme A Really Great Workout! (2008)

References

Musical groups established in 1988
Australian pop music groups
ABBA tribute bands
Australian parodists
Australian comedy musicians
Parody musicians
Victoria (Australia) musical groups